John Arbuthnott, 8th Viscount of Arbuthnott DL FRSE (16 January 1778 – 10 January 1860) was a Scottish peer and soldier. Known as "the rich Lord" he built the bridge in front of Arbuthnott House, Kincardineshire. He was the first member of the family who consistently spelled his name "Arbuthnott" rather than "Arbuthnot".

Life
He was the son of the 7th Viscount Arbuthnott and Isabella Graham.

He served in the 7th Dragoon Guards (Princess Royal's) and the 52nd Regiment of Foot, reaching the rank of Captain. On 27 February 1800, he succeeded to his father's titles. Arbuthnot was Lord Lieutenant of Kincardineshire from 1805 to 1847, and Lord Rector of King's College, Aberdeen from 1827 to 1837.

He had long service in the House of Lords as a representative peer for Scotland between 1818 and 1820, and between 1821 and 1847. He fell from a horse in 1829 and suffered a severe head injury. As a consequence in 1848 he was prosecuted for fraud, forgery and uttering and, although the family paid his debts, the Viscount left Scotland, never to return; his heir ran the estate from 1850. He is thought to have died in Bruges.

Positions held
Lord Lieutenant of Kincardineshire (1805–1847)
Rector of King's College, Aberdeen (1827–1835)

Publications
On The Potato Disease, Crop 1845 (an account of the beginnings of the Highland Potato Famine)

Family
On 25 June 1805, he married Margaret Ogilvy, daughter of Walter Ogilvy, 8th Earl of Airlie. They had four sons, and seven daughters:

John Arbuthnott, 9th Viscount of Arbuthnott (4 Jun 1806 – 26 May 1891)
Hon. Jane Ogilvy (b. 9 Aug 1807) married Capt. James Cheape. They had no known issue.
Hon. Walter (21 Nov 1808 – 5 Jan 1891) married Anna Maria Ottley. They had a son, the future Walter Charles Warner Arbuthnott, 13th Viscount of Arbuthnott, and Kathleen Georgina.
Hon. Margaret (6 Feb 1810 – 4 March 1845) married William James Lumsden. They had known issue.
Hon. Isabella Mary (b. 5 June 1811)
Lieutenant-Colonel Hon. Hugh (13 Aug 1812 – 5 Feb 1866) married Susannah Morrison Campbell. They had two sons.
Hon. Anne Charlotte (b. 17 Nov 1813)
Hon. Helen (10 Apr 1815 – 23 Apr 1840). She married Frederick Lewis Scrymgeour-Wedderburn, grandson of Captain Hon. Frederick Lewis Maitland. They had one son.
Hon. Louisa Charlotte (b. 19 Apr 1817)
Hon. Clementina Maria (b. 17 Aug 1818). She married William Rose Campbell. They had no known issue.
Hon. David CSI (13 Apr 1820 – 27 Jul 1901) married Elizabeth Reynolds, daughter of Dr. Thomas Forbes Reynolds. They had four sons, and three daughter together. He also had three others sons before their marriage.

References

Bibliography

External links

1778 births
1860 deaths
7th Dragoon Guards officers
52nd Regiment of Foot officers
Lord-Lieutenants of Kincardineshire
Scottish representative peers
Rectors of the University of Aberdeen
John Arbuthnot, 8th Viscount
8